William Kingsmill alias William Basyng (?–1549) was Prior of St. Swithun's Priory, Winchester until the Dissolution of the Monastery in 1539; it was a Benedictine monastic house and its shrine to the saint popularly associated with determining the entire period of pre-harvest weather was a place of pilgrimage. He was appointed as the first Dean of Winchester Cathedral at the foundation of the new chapter in 1541.

Biography

William Kingsmill was professed to the Rule of Saint Benedict at St. Swithun's Priory (Winchester Cathedral) in 1513. Upon joining the Benedictine Monastery he took on the name of his home town Basyng and was known as William Basyng until 1540. During his time as a monk, Basyng obtained several secular appointments. Bishop Foxe of Winchester ordained Basyng as a Deacon in 1521. Two years later, Basyng was fully ordained as a priest. During his time as a monk, Basyng studied logic, philosophy and theology, and was granted the degree of Bachelor of Theology by University of Oxford on 1 June 1526. Over the next three years, Basyng participated in four public disputations on theology, and received his licence to preach in January 1529. His final disputation was presented on 4 February, and he received his Doctorate in Theology on 15 March 1529.

Basyng became a leader within the priory due to his education and experience with the outside world as a secular cleric. In 1529, when Henry VIII summoned the Reformation Parliament, he also summoned a meeting of Bishops, Deans, Priors and leading monks and clergy to a Convocation of Canterbury. Basyng was summoned as a representative for St. Swithun's, along with his prior, Henry Broke. Basyng may not have attended, though Prior Broke seems to have been present. As a lesser clergyman, Basyng's selection to the Convocation singled him out for future promotion, such as then Archdeacons Stephen Gardiner and Thomas Cranmer.

Over the next six years, Basing rose within the ranks of the Priory to the position of "Hordarius et Coquinarius" meaning in charge of the kitchens, and over the non-sacred property of the monastery. When Henry VIII commissioned an evaluation of all the property held by the monastery in 1535, Basyng controlled the largest amount of wealth, second only to the Prior. Though Basyng was not the subprior, he was still controlled enough respect at the monastery, and enough political power outside St. Swithun's to be a viable candidate for the next prior.  Prior Bloke had served as subprior for almost ten years before his election for prior in 1524. Broke had served with little to no complaint during his tenure, but with the legal and religious changes of the 1530s, his conservative position on church doctrine made him a target for reformers.

Sometime after the valuation of St. Swithun's, a scholar and monk named Richard Mylls brought Prior Broke to the attention of Thomas Cromwell. Cromwell was battling the Bishop of Winchester, Stephen Gardiner for political power in the diocese, while also trying to place proponents of the Royal Supremacy and further reforms against Catholic traditions, such as the removal of relics. A monk named Richard Mylls sent a protest to Cromwell that Broke had forbidden him to study at Oxford because Mylls had spoken out against the veneration of saints, pilgrimages, and the Rule of Saint Benedict. Broke's conservative theological opinion, combined with rumours that Broke had stolen and sold jewels from the Priory in London, brought his term to a quick close. In March 1536, Broke resigned his position, as he felt he would have been deprived by Cromwell anyway. Basyng sought nominations from Cromwell and local elites, going so far as to offer Cromwell £500 in fees from the priory lands if elected. Thomas Parry, a local noble, wrote to Cromwell on Basyng's behalf, and stated that Basyng was "a man of learning and a favourer of the truth", meaning he was sympathetic to Cromwell's religious goals. The brothers of Saint Swithun elected Basyng, and served a quiet tenure for the next few years.

By 1538, Cromwell and King Henry were promoting Protestant theological ideas beyond the political break with Rome. Cromwell issued new visitations to the monasteries charged with removing shrines, and other religious images. St. Swithun's was home to the shrine and relics of St. Swithun, a popular site of pilgrimage among local English and French. The visitors came to St. Swithun's in September 1538, and removed the shrine of St. Swithun at 3 a.m. One visitor, Thomas Wriothesley reported that Basyng and the other brothers were "conformable" to the destruction of the images within the cathedral. A year later, Basyng surrendered the priory to King Henry, and the church was converted into a 'new college' and Basyng was appointed guardian. At the surrender of the monastery, Basyng dropped his monastic name in favour of his family name, Kingsmill.

On 1 May 1541, Henry returned most of the lands and rents back to the Cathedral at Winchester, while reorganising the former priory into a chapter run by a Dean with twelve prebendaries. Kingsmill was selected to be the first dean at what was now the Cathedral Church of the Holy Trinity. Kingsmill's loyalty to the crown and his control over much of the diocese's wealth aided him in gaining new benefices and appointments. In 1542, Kingsmill became the vicar of Overton, Hampshire, which he held without complaint until his resignation in 1545. At the time of his resignation as vicar, he held the Rectories of Aldershot, St. Peter's, Wiltshire, Alverstoke, and Colmer. In October 1544, when Kingsmill received a dispensation to hold multiple benefices, he was listed as one of the King's Chaplains. Kingsmill continued to serve the crown in his various capacities until his death in early 1549.

Notes

1549 deaths
Deans of Winchester
People associated with the Dissolution of the Monasteries
Year of birth unknown
16th-century English clergy
People from Old Basing